Mette Davidsen-Nielsen (born May 10, 1965, in Frederiksberg) is a Danish journalist, who served as the CEO for Dagbladet Information from 2010 to 2016. Since 2016, she has been the cultural editor for Politiken.

References 

1965 births
Living people
20th-century Danish journalists
21st-century Danish journalists